The Pancake Range is located in east-central Nevada in the United States. Neighboring ranges include the White Pine, Grant and Quinn Canyon ranges across Railroad Valley on the east-southeast; and Park and Hot Creek ranges across Big Sandy Springs and Hot Creek valleys on the west-northwest. The south end of Newark Valley lies at the extreme north end of the range. The Lunar Crater Volcanic Field lies at the southwestern end of the chain with the Reveille Range to the south.

Ely lies to the east and Eureka lies to the west of the north end of the Pancake Range. US route 50 between these two cities crosses the very north end of the range at Pancake Summit (elevation ). Further south the community of Duckwater and the Duckwater Indian Reservation lies in the Duckwater Valley portion of Railroad Valley to the east of the range. The unpaved former Nevada route 20/379 crosses the range between Duckwater and Eureka at Red Rock Summit in the southwest corner of White Pine County. U.S. Route 6 crosses the Pancake Range at Sandy Summit north of Lunar Crater between Currant to the east and Warm Springs to the southwest of the range. Nevada route 375, the Extraterrestrial Highway, traverses the valley east from Warm Springs between the Pancake and Reveille ranges.

The Bureau of Land Management manages 99.9% of the 864 square mile (2,238 km²) mountain area. Trees found in the range include: Utah Juniper (Juniperus osteosperma), Single-leaf Pinyon (Pinus monophylla), and Rocky Mountain Juniper (Juniperus scopulorum). Mammals found in the Pancake Range include: pronghorn, long-tailed pocket mouse, chisel-toothed kangaroo rat, and the little pocket mouse.

Pancake Range was so named on account of its relatively flat outline.

References

 Biological Resources Research Center
 Nevada Atlas & Gazetteer, DeLorme, 2001, pgs. 47 & 55

Mountain ranges of Nevada
Mountain ranges of the Great Basin
Mountain ranges of Nye County, Nevada